Anthene kampala, the Kampala ciliate blue, is a butterfly in the family Lycaenidae. It is found in the Republic of the Congo, the Democratic Republic of the Congo (Mongala, Uele, Tshopo, Kinshasa and Sankuru), Uganda and possibly eastern Nigeria and Cameroon. The habitat consists of forests.

References

Butterflies described in 1910
Anthene